Ocoña District is one of eight districts of the province Camaná in Peru. Its seat is Ocoña.

See also 
 Ocoña River

References

Districts of the Camaná Province
Districts of the Arequipa Region